The Guozijian, sometimes translated as the Imperial College, Imperial Academy, Imperial University, National Academy, or National University, was the national central institution of higher learning in Chinese dynasties after the Sui dynasty. It was the highest institution of academic research and learning in China's traditional educational system, with the function of administration of education.

History
Formerly it was called the Taixue, literally meaning "Imperial University". The Taixue for Gongsheng (tribute students) from the populace was part of Guozijian, along with Guozixue for noble students. The central schools of taixue were established as far back as 3 CE, when a standard nationwide school system was established and funded during the reign of Emperor Ping of Han.

Since the Sui dynasty, it was called Guozijian.

During the Ming dynasty, the Hongwu Emperor promoted the study of law, math, calligraphy, equestrianism, and archery at the Guozijian.

In 1905, the Guozijian was shut down. During the 1898 reform of the Qing Dynasty, the education and administration of education functions of Guozijian was mainly replaced by the Imperial Capital University (also translated as Imperial University of Peking), later known as Peking University.

Locations

Guozijian were located in the national capital of each dynasty, such as Chang'an, Luoyang, Kaifeng and Hangzhou. In early years of Ming, Guozijian was in Nanjing, and then there were two capitals, thus there were two Guozijian, one in Nanjing (later become Nanjing University) and one in Beijing. During the Qing dynasty, Guozijian was in Beijing.

The Beijing Guozijian, located at the Guozijian Street in the Dongcheng District, was the imperial college during the Yuan, Ming and Qing dynasties; most of the current buildings were built during the Ming Dynasty. It is the last Guozijian in China and the predecessor of Peking University.

Vietnam 
In Vietnam, the Imperial Academy (Vietnamese: Quốc Tử Giám) existed during the Trần dynasty and afterwards. Several notable chairmen of the Guozijian were Chu Văn An, Nguyễn Phi Khanh, and Vũ Miên.

In Vietnam, the Imperial Academy was based at the Temple of Literature in Hanoi.

See also
Academies (Shuyuan)
Ancient higher-learning institutions
Peking University
Nanjing University

References

Citations

Sources 
 Chang, Che-chia. "The Qing Imperial Academy of Medicine: Its institutions and the physicians shaped by them." East Asian Science, Technology, and Medicine 41.1 (2015): 63–92. online
 Sivin, Nathan. "Science and Medicine in Imperial China--the state of the field." Journal of Asian Studies (1988): 41–90. online
 Yuan, Zheng. "Local Government Schools in Sung China: A Reassessment," History of Education Quarterly (Volume 34, Number 2; Summer 1994): 193–213.

Confucian education
Chinese culture
History of Imperial China
Ancient universities
History of education in China

ru:Гоцзыцзянь